Yves Bouthillier (26 February 1901 – 4 January 1977) was a French politician. He served as the French Minister of Finance from 1940 to 1942.

Early life
Bouthillier was born in Saint-Martin-de-Ré to Mathilde Bouju and Louis Bouthillier, a merchant. He graduated from the École Centrale Paris.

Career
Bouthillier served as the French Ministry of Finance from 1940 to 1942.

Personal life
Bouthillier married Germaine Bouju on 3 August 1922. They had a daughter, Françoise.

References

External links
 

1901 births
1977 deaths
People from Charente-Maritime
École Centrale Paris alumni
Politicians of the French Third Republic
French Ministers of Finance